WJOT-FM (105.9 FM) is a radio station licensed to Wabash, Indiana broadcasting an oldies format. The station serves the areas of Wabash, Indiana, Huntington, Indiana, and Peru, Indiana, and is owned by Dream Weaver Marketing, LLC. The station is simulcast on WJOT AM 1510.

History
The station began broadcasting July 1, 1993, and originally held the call sign WWIP. The station aired an adult contemporary/CHR format. In July 1998, the station's call sign was changed to WJOT-FM and the station adopted an oldies format.

Technical
Transmitter is the venerable 5,000 watt Harris model HT-5FM utilizing a single high power air-cooled metal/ceramic tetrode vacuum tube (type number 4CX3500A) as its final RF amplifier stage.  The audio path is purely analog based, with an emphasis on fidelity vs. compression.

References

External links
WJOT's official website

JOT-FM
Oldies radio stations in the United States
Radio stations established in 1993
1993 establishments in Indiana